Fadl al-Qaysi or Faḍl al-Shāʻirah ( "Faḍl the Poet"; d. 871) was one of "three early ʻAbbasid singing girls ... particularly famous for their poetry" and is one of the pre-eminent medieval Arabic female poets whose work survives.

Life

Born in al-Yamama (now in Bahrain), Fadl was brought up in ʻAbbasid Basra, (now in Iraq). Her brothers sold her to a leading officer of the Caliphate, and he gave her to Caliph Al-Mutawakkil (r. 847–861). Fadl became a prominent figure in the court. According to ibn Annadim, a bibliographer (died 1047), Fadl's diwan extended to twenty pages. Her pupils included the singer Farida.

Fadl was the concubine of Al-Mutawakkil. She was a poet, born in Al-Yamamah. She was from the Abd al-Qays tribe. She was purchased by Muhammad ibn al-Faraj al-Rukhkhaji, who gave her to Al-Mutawakkil. 

She died in 870-71.

Poetry

An example of Fadl's work, in the translation of Abdullah al-Udhari, is:

The following poem was written in response to the poet Abu Dulaf (d. 840) who hinted in a poem that she was not a virgin and he preferred virgins, whom he compared to unpierced pearls.

 Riding beasts are no joy to ride until they're bridled and mounted.
 So pearls are useless unless they're pierced and threaded.

References

Citations

Sources
 
 
 
 

871 deaths
Arabic-language women poets
Arabic-language poets
9th-century women writers
9th-century Arabic poets
9th-century deaths
Women poets from the Abbasid Caliphate
9th-century women from the Abbasid Caliphate
Arabian slaves and freedmen
Concubines of the Abbasid caliphs
Qiyan
9th-century women musicians
Slaves from the Abbasid Caliphate
Medieval Arabic singers
Singers of the medieval Islamic world